Emily Ann Woodhouse (born 13 October 1996) is an English cricketer who currently plays for Norfolk. She plays as a right-arm off break bowler and right-handed batter. She previously played for Sunrisers.

Early life
Woodhouse was born on 13 October 1996 in King's Lynn, Norfolk.

Domestic career
Woodhouse made her county debut in 2009, for Norfolk against Cornwall. She had a breakthrough season in the 2011 Women's County Championship, as she was her side's leading wicket-taker, with 10 wickets at an average of 10.70. She was again her side's leading wicket-taker in the 2013 Championship, and hit her maiden half-century in the Twenty20 Cup the same season. In 2014, she was Norfolk's leading run-scorer in both competitions, as well as taking 6 wickets at an average of 15.50 in the County Championship. In 2015, Woodhouse made her List A high score, scoring 50* against Northumberland. The same season, she took 3 wickets in 4 balls in a match against Cambridgeshire and Huntingdonshire, finishing with figures of 3/0.

Ahead of the following season, 2016, Woodhouse was made Norfolk's full-time captain. That season, she scored her second half-century in the County Championship, as  well as taking 10 wickets at an average of 18.40. 2018 saw Woodhouse achieve both her List A best bowling figures, taking 5/32 against Lincolnshire, and her Twenty20 high score, making 67 against the same opponents. She had a strong season in the following year's Twenty20 Cup, scoring 110 runs including 58* made against Suffolk, as well as taking 7 wickets overall at an average of 12.71.

In the 2020 East of England Women's County Championship, Woodhouse was the second-highest run-scorer in the 50-over section of the competition, with 134 runs including a top score of 71. In the 2021 edition of the same tournament, she scored 108 from 100 deliveries in Norfolk's two-wicket victory over Hertfordshire.

In 2021, Woodhouse was selected in the Sunrisers squad for the upcoming season. She played two matches for the side in the Charlotte Edwards Cup.

References

External links

1996 births
Living people
Cricketers from King's Lynn
Norfolk women cricketers
Sunrisers women's cricketers